The Rookery Mound is an archaeological site near Everglades City, Florida. On November 5, 1996, it was added to the U.S. National Register of Historic Places.

References

External links
 Monroe County listings at National Register of Historic Places

Archaeological sites in Florida
National Register of Historic Places in Monroe County, Florida
National Register of Historic Places in Everglades National Park
Mounds in Florida